Clarence A. Winder (March 30, 1887 - July 22, 1959) served as Mayor of Pasadena, California from 1953 to 1955.

Early life

Winder was born in Cincinnati, Ohio on March 30, 1887. After attending local schools, Winder graduated from the University of Cincinnati in 1909 with a degree in electrical engineering. At the University of Cincinnati, Winder took some law courses and earned a master's degree, also in electrical engineering. Immediately following graduation, Winder began working for General Electric in the company's electrical heating division.

Career

In 1925, Winder began a long association with municipal government, when he became a superintendent of public utilities in Ft. Worth, Texas. Four years later, he relocated to California, where he became an engineering consultant. In 1933, he was appointed to a post at the Rural Electrification Administration, where he was responsible for laying down over 200,000 miles of lines.

In 1953, Winder served as mayor of Pasadena, California until 1955.

In 1954, he was appointed to a post with the Metropolitan Transit Authority, which was responsible for the development of public transit for the Greater Los Angeles Area.

In the early morning of Wednesday, July 22, 1959, Winder died of cancer at a Pasadena-area hospital.

References

People from the San Gabriel Valley
Mayors of Pasadena, California
University of Cincinnati alumni
1887 births
1959 deaths
California Republicans
Texas Republicans
20th-century American politicians